Charles A. Bassey (born October 28, 2000) is a Nigerian basketball player for the San Antonio Spurs of the National Basketball Association (NBA). He played college basketball for the Western Kentucky Hilltoppers. He was drafted by the Philadelphia 76ers in the 2021 NBA draft.

Early life
Bassey was born in Lagos, Nigeria, where he played soccer until age 12, standing  at the time. At that age, he was discovered by a youth basketball coach while Bassey was selling fried chicken on the side of a road and wearing flip-flops that were too small for him. He stopped playing soccer soon after, instead focusing on developing his basketball skills. At age 14, Bassey was named most valuable player (MVP) of basketball camp Giants of Africa, a program established by Toronto Raptors executive Masai Ujiri.

High school career
By then, recruiting analysts considered him one of the best prospects in his class. As a freshman, Bassey averaged 20.2 points, 17.1 rebounds and 5.9 blocks per game, leading his team to the Texas Association of Private and Parochial Schools (TAPPS) title game. Bassey competed in the Jordan Brand Classic International Game, where he was named MVP. Before his sophomore season, Bassey was ruled ineligible by the TAPPS, with St. Anthony filing an appeal. He still made his season debut, and head coach Jeff Merritt was fired for playing an ineligible player. St. Anthony withdrew from the TAPPS and joined the Texas Christian Athletic League, allowing Bassey to become eligible again.

For his junior season, Bassey transferred to DeSales High School in Louisville, Kentucky and began playing basketball for Aspire Basketball Academy in Louisville. He made the decision after Hennssy Auriantal, his legal guardian and an assistant coach at St. Anthony, was dismissed from the program. As a junior, he averaged 19.4 points and 12.8 rebounds per game.

Recruiting
Bassey was a consensus five-star recruit and one of the top centers in the 2018 class. On June 13, 2018, he reclassified to the 2018 class and committed to playing college basketball for Western Kentucky.

College career
On November 18, 2018, Bassey recorded a freshman season-high 25 points and 10 rebounds in a 78–62 loss to UCF. On January 31, 2019, he posted 22 points and 18 rebounds, the most rebounds by a Western Kentucky freshman since 1972. As a freshman, Bassey averaged 14.6 points, 10 rebounds and 2.4 blocks per game, earning First Team All-Conference USA, Defensive Player of the Year and Freshman of the Year honors. He recorded the most rebounds, blocks and double-doubles by a freshman in program history. Bassey's sophomore season was cut short by a tibial plateau fracture he suffered against Arkansas that required surgery. Through 10 games, he was averaging 15.3 points, 9.2 rebounds and 1.6 blocks per game. 

On November 26, 2020, Bassey recorded 21 points, 14 rebounds and a career-high seven blocks in a 75–69 win over Memphis. On December 10, he had a career-high 29 points and 14 rebounds in an 86–84 victory against Gardner–Webb. At the close of the 2020–21 regular season, he was named the Conference USA Player of the Year, while repeating as the league's Defensive Player of the Year. He averaged 17.6 points per game, 11.6 rebounds and 3.1 blocks per game. Following the season, he declared for the 2021 NBA draft, forgoing his remaining college eligibility.

Professional career

Philadelphia 76ers (2021–2022)
Bassey was selected in the second round of the 2021 NBA draft with the 53rd pick by the Philadelphia 76ers, subsequently joining them for the 2021 NBA Summer League. On September 24, 2021, he signed with the 76ers.

On October 13, 2022, Bassey was waived by the 76ers.

San Antonio Spurs (2022–present)
On October 24, 2022, the San Antonio Spurs announced that they had signed Bassey to a two-way contract, splitting time with the Spurs' NBA G League affiliate, the Austin Spurs. He was named to the G League's inaugural Next Up Game for the 2022–23 season. On February 14, 2023, the Spurs converted Bassey's deal to a four-year, $10.2 million standard contract. On March 14, 2023, during a 132–114 win over the Orlando Magic, he suffered a left knee injury. The next day, the Spurs announced that Bassey was diagnosed with a fracture of his left patellar tendon, ending his season.

Career statistics

NBA

Regular season

|-
| style="text-align:left;"| 
| style="text-align:left;"| Philadelphia
| 23 || 0 || 7.3 || .638 || .000 || .750 || 2.7 || .3 || .2 || .7 || 3.0
|-
| style="text-align:left;"| 
| style="text-align:left;"| San Antonio
| 35 || 2 || 14.5 || .644 || .375 || .595 || 5.5 || 1.4 || .5 || .9 || 5.7
|- class="sortbottom"
| style="text-align:center;" colspan="2"| Career
| 58 || 2 || 11.7 || .643 || .250 || .633 || 4.4 || .9 || .4 || .9 || 4.6

Playoffs

|-
| style="text-align:left;"| 2022
| style="text-align:left;"| Philadelphia
| 3 || 0 || 4.0 || .500 || — || .000 || 1.7 || .3 || .0 || .3 || .7
|- class="sortbottom"
| style="text-align:center;" colspan="2"| Career
| 3 || 0 || 4.0 || .500 || — || .000 || 1.7 || .3 || .0 || .3 || .7

College

|-
| style="text-align:left;"| 2018–19
| style="text-align:left;"| Western Kentucky
| 34 || 34 || 31.4 || .627 || .450 || .769 || 10.0 || .7 || .8 || 2.4 || 14.6
|-
| style="text-align:left;"| 2019–20
| style="text-align:left;"| Western Kentucky
| 10 || 10 || 28.1 || .533 || .167 || .787 || 9.2 || 1.3 || .8 || 1.6 || 15.3
|-
| style="text-align:left;"| 2020–21
| style="text-align:left;"| Western Kentucky
| 28 || 28 || 30.4 || .590 || .305 || .759 || 11.6 || .7 || .4 || 3.1 || 17.6
|- class="sortbottom"
| style="text-align:center;" colspan="2"| Career
| 72 || 72 || 30.5 || .596 || .319 || .768 || 10.5 || .8 || .6 || 2.6 || 15.9

Personal life
Shortly after arriving in the United States at age 14, Bassey's mother died. At the time, Bassey considered moving back to Nigeria, but his father Akpan Ebong Bassey encouraged him to stay for financial reasons. 

Canadian-born basketball coach, Hennssy Auriantal, who runs the Yes II Success organization that brings international players to American private schools, helped bring Bassey to the United States. On March 31, 2017, Auriantal and his wife were granted conservatorship over Bassey. Bassey's father later filed a petition to reopen the case and give Nigerian basketball tournament organizer John Faniran custody over his son, but the petition was dropped due to lack of verification.

References

External links
Western Kentucky Hilltoppers bio

2000 births
Living people
All-American college men's basketball players
Austin Spurs players
Centers (basketball)
Delaware Blue Coats players
Nigerian expatriate basketball people in the United States
Nigerian men's basketball players
Philadelphia 76ers draft picks
Philadelphia 76ers players
Power forwards (basketball)
San Antonio Spurs players
Sportspeople from Lagos
Western Kentucky Hilltoppers basketball players